Serge Baudo (born 16 July 1927) is a French conductor, the son of the oboist Étienne Baudo. He is the nephew of the cellist Paul Tortelier.

Baudo was conductor of the Orchestra of Radio Nice from 1959 to 1962. He then served as permanent conductor at the Paris Opera from 1962 to 1965. Baudo also worked on the music of two Jacques-Yves Cousteau films: in 1964 he composed and conducted the music of World Without Sun and in 1976 he conducted some Maurice Ravel musical pieces for Voyage to the Edge of the World (a Cousteau film about a four months expedition in Antarctica). He conducted the world premieres of the operas La mère coupable by Darius Milhaud in June 1966 in Geneva as well as Andrea del Sarto by Jean-Yves Daniel-Lesur in January 1969 in Marseille . Baudo became music director of the Orchestre philharmonique Rhône-Alpes, later the Orchestre National de Lyon, in 1971, and served in this post until 1987. During his time in Lyon, he founded the Berlioz Festival, in 1979.

References

French male conductors (music)
1927 births
Living people
20th-century French conductors (music)
21st-century French conductors (music)
20th-century French male musicians
21st-century French male musicians